Pádraig McNally is a Fianna Fáil Councillor on Monaghan County Council for the Carrickmacross-Castbleblayney Local Electoral Area. He was first elected to the Council at the 1985 local elections and has been re-elected at each subsequent local election. Prior to boundary changes before the Irish 2014 local elections he had solely represented the Carrickmacross LEA. He also served on Carrickmacross Town Council before its abolition in 2014.

In June 2014 he was elected Cathaoirleach of Monaghan County Council, the fourth time he had held this office. That same month he was elected National President of the AILG; the Association of Irish Local Government.

References
Electoral history
McNally elected Cathaoirleach of Monaghan CC
McNally elected National President of AILG

Living people
Fianna Fáil politicians
Local councillors in County Monaghan
Year of birth missing (living people)